The 2016–17 Stade Rennais season is the 116th professional season of the club since its creation in 1901.

Players

French teams are limited to four players without EU citizenship. Hence, the squad list includes only the principal nationality of each player; several non-European players on the squad have dual citizenship with an EU country. Also, players from the ACP countries—countries in Africa, the Caribbean, and the Pacific that are signatories to the Cotonou Agreement—are not counted against non-EU quotas due to the Kolpak ruling.

Current squad
''.

Out on loan

Transfers

Summer

In:

Out:

Winter

In:

Out:

Competitions

Ligue 1

League table

Results summary

Results by round

Matches

Coupe de France

Coupe de la Ligue

References 

Stade Rennais F.C. seasons
Rennes